Grand Ayatollah Sayyid Mousa Shubairi Zanjani (born March 2, 1928) is an Iranian Twelver Shia Marja'.

Biography 
He was born in Qom to Sayyid Ahmed Shubairi Zanjani in Azerbaijani Turkic family.

He has studied in the Qom Seminary under Sayyid Hossein Borujerdi and Mohaqeq Damad, as well as in the Najaf Seminary under Sayyid Abu al-Qasim al-Khoei, Sayyid Muhsin al-Hakim, and Sayyid Abd al-Hadi Shirazi.

He currently resides and teaches in the seminary of Qom. He is a leading expert on the discipline of Ilm ar-Rijal, which seeks to authentically and efficiently pass judgment on the reliability of narrators of Hadith. He leads the prayers in the Fatima Masumeh Shrine.

His students include: Sayyid Muhammad-Kadhim al-Tabatabaei, Sayyid Abd al-Hadi al-Mas'udi, and Sayyid Adil al-Alawi.

See also
List of Maraji

References 

People from Qom
1928 births
Living people
People from Zanjan, Iran
Al-Moussawi family
Society of Seminary Teachers of Qom members

External links 

 Official website